Dunderave Castle is an L-plan castle built in the 16th century as the Scottish seat of the MacNaughton clan.

Description

The castle is in use as a residence. The present castle was built after their previous castle was destroyed following a Plague infection. The old castle, and remnants of McNaughton crannógs, can still be seen on the lochan known as the Dubh Loch at the head of Glen Shira.

The name Dunderave is of Gaelic origin. Since the MacNachtans were designated 'of Dunderave' from as early as 1473, the place-name appears to have moved with the clan from the Dubh Loch. It has been suggested that the name derives either from Dun-an-Rudha, meaning 'The Knoll on the Promontory', or else from Dun-da-Ramh, 'The Castle of Two Oars'. The latter is taken to imply that there was a ferry near the site of the castle.

Alexander Campbell of Cawdor visited Dunderave in September 1591.

The castle was restored and remodelled in 1911 by Sir Robert Lorimer relandscaping the gardens at the same time.

See also
Fraoch Eilean, Loch Awe - earlier MacNauchtan castle
Dundarave House - the Irish seat of the MacNaughton clan

References

Bibliography

External links
Overview of Dundarave Castle from the Gazetteer for Scotland
Dundarave Castle in the 1900s

Buildings and structures completed in the 16th century
Castles in Argyll and Bute
Category A listed buildings in Argyll and Bute
16th-century architecture in the United Kingdom